Harold Oshkaly Cummings Segura (born 1 March 1992) is a Panamanian professional footballer who plays as a centre-back for Bolivian Primera División club Club Always Ready and captains the Panama national football team.

Club career

Árabe Unido
In 2009, he signed for Liga Panameña de Fútbol club Árabe Unido where he made 22 appearances. In 2011, he signed for Uruguayan Primera División club River Plate on loan.

Juan Aurich
In January 2014 he joined Peruvian outfit Juan Aurich to play alongside compatriot Luis Tejada

Independiente Santa Fe
In January 2015 he signed for Categoría Primera A club Independiente Santa Fe.

San Jose Earthquakes
In January 2017 he signed for Major League Soccer club San Jose Earthquakes joining Panama teammate Aníbal Godoy. Cummings suffered a broken leg at his home in March. Following this injury, he was listed as out for the season in May without having made a single appearance for San Jose. Cummings made his MLS debut on 3 March 2018, in San Jose's season-opening 3–2 victory over Minnesota United.

International career
Cummings was part of the Panama U-20 squad that participated in the 2011 CONCACAF U-20 Championship where he help his nation qualify to the 2011 FIFA U-20 World Cup in Colombia.

His senior international debut for Panama came on 7 September 2010 against Trinidad and Tobago, in a Friendly match played in Panama City. In 2011, he was called up by Julio Dely Valdés to play the 2011 CONCACAF Gold Cup.

At the start of 2017, Cummings was named to the 2017 Copa Centroamericana Best XI for his performances in the January tournament, which qualified Panama for the 2017 CONCACAF Gold Cup. In February, he received a call-up for Panama's 2018 FIFA World Cup qualification matches against Trinidad and Tobago and the United States on 24 and 28 March, respectively, but was called home from camp by San Jose due to injury issues that the club did not wish to aggravate. These injuries persisted throughout the year and prevented him from taking part in the Gold Cup and in Panama's September World Cup qualifiers as well.

Cummings said in February 2018 that he hoped to make a successful comeback from his injuries and perform well for San Jose, for which he did not appear in 2017, and translate a strong club appearance into call-ups for Panama's March friendlies and eventual 2018 FIFA World Cup appearance, the first in national history. He was called up to the squad for friendlies against Denmark and Switzerland on 22 and 27 March, respectively, alongside San Jose teammate Aníbal Godoy.

In May 2018 he was named in Panama's preliminary 35 man squad for the 2018 World Cup in Russia.

Career statistics

Club
Statistics accurate as of 7 April 2018.

International

International goals

Cummings scored his first international goal on November 20, 2018.  However, this goal was cancelled by an own goal he scored on September 8, 2019 against Bermuda.

Scores and results list El Salvador's goal tally first.

Honours

Santa Fe
 Copa Sudamericana: 2015

References

External links
 
 

1992 births
Living people
Sportspeople from Panama City
Association football defenders
Panamanian footballers
C.D. Árabe Unido players
Club Atlético River Plate (Montevideo) players
Juan Aurich footballers
L.D. Alajuelense footballers
Independiente Santa Fe footballers
San Jose Earthquakes players
Unión Española footballers
Peruvian Segunda División players
Liga FPD players
Categoría Primera A players
Uruguayan Primera División players
Chilean Primera División players
Major League Soccer players
Panama under-20 international footballers
Panama youth international footballers
Panamanian expatriate footballers
Panama international footballers
2011 Copa Centroamericana players
2011 CONCACAF Gold Cup players
2013 Copa Centroamericana players
2013 CONCACAF Gold Cup players
2014 Copa Centroamericana players
2015 CONCACAF Gold Cup players
Copa América Centenario players
2017 Copa Centroamericana players
2018 FIFA World Cup players
2019 CONCACAF Gold Cup players
2021 CONCACAF Gold Cup players
Expatriate footballers in Chile
Expatriate footballers in Uruguay
Expatriate footballers in Peru
Expatriate footballers in Colombia
Expatriate soccer players in the United States
Panamanian expatriates in Chile
Panamanian expatriate sportspeople in Uruguay
Panamanian expatriate sportspeople in Peru
Panamanian expatriate sportspeople in Colombia
Panamanian expatriate sportspeople in the United States